Giimbiyu may refer to: 

Giimbiyu people
Giimbiyu language